The Nuart Theatre is an art house movie theater in Los Angeles, California, United States. It is the flagship location of the Landmark Theatres chain in the United States.

Location
The Nuart is on Santa Monica Boulevard, one block from the 405 Freeway. It hosts a weekly Saturday midnight movie showing of The Rocky Horror Picture Show featuring Sins O' The Flesh.

History 
The Nuart was built in 1929. The Nuart was bought by Landmark Theatres in 1974 and was the first Landmark theater, soon joined by others including the UC Theater in Berkeley. The theater was remodeled in 2006 and currently seats 303 people.

In Popular Culture 
The theater was used in the Chevy Chase–Goldie Hawn comedy film Foul Play, although the film is set in San Francisco.

John Waters starred in a "No Smoking" theatrical trailer projected first at the Nuart Theatre in which he advises patrons to 'smoke anyway'. In addition Mr. Waters also stars in a Nuart specific theatrical trailer in appreciation to the theater for showing Pink Flamingos for many years and making star DIVINE a 'Filth Goddess'. Mr. Waters also appeared in a theatrical trailer for the film festival Shock Value. The John Waters trailers were directed by Douglas Brian Martin and produced by Douglas Brian Martin and Steven M. Martin. The Nuart also projected theatrical trailers by the Martin brothers featuring David Lynch and Peter Ivers.

The Nuart was the location for the theatrical world premiere of Beyond the Valley of the Ultra Vixens directed by Russ Meyer. Edith Massey of Pink Flamingos fame performed on a makeshift stage with her punk rock band The Incredible Edible Eggs featuring Regina 'Gina' Schock on drums prior to Ms. Schock becoming a member of the all-girl rock band The Go-Go's. Director Michel Gondry filmed part of Beck's video for "Deadweight" at the Nuart. The Nuart is mentioned in Cannibal Women in the Avocado Jungle of Death.

Reference List

External links
 
Cinema Treasures: Nuart Theatre
https://web.archive.org/web/20100222092057/http://www.landmarktheatres.com/AboutLandmark/AboutIndex.htm

Cinemas and movie theaters in Los Angeles
Landmarks in Los Angeles
Event venues established in 1929